Ecce Homo is the title of a series of paintings by the Italian Renaissance master Antonello da Messina. They date from 1470 to 1475.

Paintings
Antonello is known to have treated this subject four times; three (b, c, d) are variations of the same design; a fourth (a) differs.
a) Christ Crowned with Thorns, in the collection of Gaspar Méndez de Haro, 7th Marquis of Carpio in 1687; Don Giulio Alliata, Palermo, 1698, when it was said to bear the date 1470, now illegible;  ...Michael Friedsam, New York; Metropolitan Museum of Art, acc. no.32.100.82.
b) Picture Gallery of Collegio Alberoni, Piacenza, dated 1472.
c) Kunsthistorisches Museum, Vienna, dated 1474.
d) National Gallery of the Palazzo Spinola, Genoa.

See also
Italian Renaissance painting, development of themes

Notes

Further reading

External links
Description 

1470s paintings
1475 paintings
Paintings by Antonello da Messina
Anto